KYOA (98.7 FM) is a radio station licensed to Kiowa, Oklahoma, United States. The station is currently owned by K95.5 Inc

History
This station was assigned call sign KYOA on March 22, 2013.

References

External links
http://www.blakefm1025.com/

YOA
Country radio stations in the United States
Radio stations established in 2013